Melinda Vincze (born 12 November 1983) is a Hungarian former handballer who played for Dunaújvárosi KKA and the Hungarian national team.

She made her international debut on 3 March 2007 against Norway.

Achievements
 Nemzeti Bajnokság I:
 Winner: 2003, 2004
 Silver medalist: 2005, 2008
 Bronze medalist: 2006, 2007
 Magyar Kupa:
 Silver medalist: 2008
 Bronze medalist: 2007, 2011
 European Championship:
 Bronze medalist: 2012

References

External links

 Melinda Vincze career statistics at Worldhandball

1983 births
Living people
Hungarian female handball players
People from Kiskőrös
Fehérvár KC players
Sportspeople from Bács-Kiskun County